The Wag-Aero Wag-a-Bond is a high-wing two-seat side-by-side homebuilt aircraft of tube-and-fabric construction. It is replica of the Piper Vagabond taildragger and produced by Wag-Aero in kit form.

Design and development
The Wag-A-Bond was the second homebuilt replica of a Piper product from parts supplier Wag-Aero. The aircraft was built to provide a side-by-side product following success of the tandem seat Wag-Aero CUBy.

The Wag-a-Bond was initially a replica of Piper's Vagabond aircraft. The Wag-A-Bond Traveler is based on the Vagabond, but has several modifications. The Traveler has doors on both sides of the cabin and two wing-mounted fuel tanks with a small header tank. The wings are the same as the Wag-Aero Acro Trainer and are built with spruce spars, wooden ribs and covered with 2024-T3 aluminium sheet. The original Wag-a-Bond design is marketed as the Wag-a-Bond Classic.

Wag-Aero company president Dick Wagner flew the Wag-a-Bond for the first time on June 9, 1978.

Variants
Classic
Original design, a reproduction of the Piper PA-17.
Traveler
Improved model with two doors, additional wing fuel tanks and enlarged baggage compartment. Recommended engine power range from

Specifications Wag-a-Bond Classic

See also

References

External links

Wag-Aero aircraft
Homebuilt aircraft
High-wing aircraft
Single-engined tractor aircraft
Aircraft first flown in 1978